In Hindu mythology, Buddhi is one of the wives of Ganesha.

Buddhi (Sanskrit: बुद्धि) refers to the intellectual faculty and the power to "form and retain concepts, reason, discern, judge, comprehend, understand".

Etymology
Buddhi is derived from the Vedic Sanskrit root Budh (बुध् ), which literally means "to wake, be awake, observe, heed, attend, learn, become aware of, to know, be conscious again". The term appears extensively in Rigveda and other Vedic literature. Buddhi means, states Monier Williams, the power to "form, retain concepts; intelligence, reason, intellect, mind", the intellectual faculty and the ability to "discern, judge, comprehend, understand" something.

Buddhi is a feminine Sanskrit noun derived from *budh, to be awake, to understand, to know. The same root is the basis for the more familiar masculine form Buddha and the abstract noun bodhi.

Buddhi contrasts from manas (मनस्) which means "mind", and ahamkara (अहंंकाऱ) which means "ego, I-sense in egotism".

Usage
In Sankhya and yogic philosophy both the mind and the ego are forms in the realm of nature (prakriti) that have emerged into materiality as a function of the three gunas (ग़ुण) through a misapprehension of purusha (पुरूष) (the consciousness-essence of the jivatman). Discriminative in nature (बुद्धि निश्चयात्मिका चित्त-वृत्ति), buddhi is that which is able to discern truth (satya) from falsehood and thereby to make wisdom possible.

The Sānkhya-Yoga View 
According to the Sānkhya-Yoga view, Buddhi is in essence unconscious, and as such, cannot be an object of its own consciousness. This means that it can neither apprehend an object nor manifest itself.

In the Yoga Sutra, it is explained that the Buddhi cannot enlighten itself, since it itself is the object of sight, "na tat svhāsam draśhyatvāt".

See also
 Three Bodies Doctrine
 Namarupa
 Citta
 Nous
 Enlightenment (spiritual)

References

External links
 An interactive map of the Yogic conception of mind.

Hindu studies
Hindu philosophical concepts